Samuel Hickson is the name of:

Samuel Hickson (British Army officer)
Samuel Hickson (footballer)